The 46th Annual GMA Dove Awards presentation ceremony was held on Tuesday, October 13, 2015, at the Allen Arena in Nashville, Tennessee. The ceremony recognized the accomplishments of musicians and other figures within the Christian music industry for the year 2014. The ceremony was produced by the Trinity Broadcasting Network and was hosted by musician Erica Campbell and television star Sadie Robertson. The awards show was broadcast on the Trinity Broadcasting Network on October 18, 2015.

Performers
The following were some of the musical artists who performed at the 46th GMA Dove Awards:
Casting Crowns
Lauren Daigle
Matt Maher
MercyMe
Danny Gokey
Tedashii
I Am They
Big Daddy Weave
Kirk Franklin
Brian Courtney Wilson
Crowder
The Erwins
Joseph Habedank
Israel Houghton

Presenters
The following were some of the presenters who presented at the 46th GMA Dove Awards:
Lincoln Brewster
Jason Crabb
Bone Hampton
Charles Jenkins
Dr. Bobby Jones
Mark Lowry
Chonda Pierce
The Newsboys', Michael Tait and Duncan Phillips
Kari Jobe
Michelle Williams
Michael W. Smith

Nominees and winners

This is a complete list of the nominees for the 46th GMA Dove Awards. The winners are in bold.

General
Song of the Year
"Overwhelmed" – Big Daddy Weave
Writers: Michael Weaver, Phil Wickham
"Thrive" – Casting Crowns
Writers: Mark Hall, Matthew West
"Come As You Are" – Crowder
Writers: Ben Glover, David Crowder, Matt Maher
"Hope in Front Of Me" – Danny Gokey
Writers: Bernie Herms, Brett James, Danny Gokey Platinum Songs
"He Knows My Name" – Francesca Battistelli
Writers: Francesca Battistelli, Mia Fieldes, Seth Mosley
"How Can It Be" – Lauren Daigle
Writers: Jason Ingram, Jeff Johnson, Paul Mabury
"Greater" – MercyMe
Writers: Barry Graul, Bart Millard, Ben Glover, David Garcia, Mike Scheuchzer, Nathan Cochran, Robby Shaffer
"Multiplied" – Needtobreathe
Writers: Bear Rinehart, Bo Rinehart
“We Believe” – Newsboys
Writers: Matthew Hooper, Richie Fike, Travis Ryan
"This Is Amazing Grace" – Phil Wickham
Writers: Jeremy Riddle, Josh Farro, Phil Wickham

Songwriter of the Year
Bart Millard
Chris Tomlin
Lecrae Moore
Matt Maher
Phil Wickham

Songwriter of the Year (Non-artist)
Benjamin Glover
David Garcia
Dianne Wilkinson
Jason Ingram
Seth Mosley

Contemporary Christian Artist of the Year
Chris Tomlin, sixstepsrecords/Sparrow Records
for KING & COUNTRY, Word Entertainment
Hillsong United, Hillsong Church T/A/Sparrow Records
Lecrae, Reach Records
MercyMe, Fair Trade Services

Southern Gospel Artist of the Year
Booth Brothers, Spring Hill Music Group
Collingsworth Family, Stowtown Records
Ernie Haase & Signature Sound, StowTown Records
Gaither Vocal Band, Spring House Music Group
The Isaacs, Spring House Music Group

Gospel Artist of the Year
Erica Campbell, Entertainment One
Fred Hammond, RCA Records
Israel & New Breed, RCA Records
Jonathan McReynolds, Light Records
Tamela Mann, Tillymann Music Group
Tasha Cobbs, Motown Gospel

Artist of the Year
for KING & COUNTRY, Fervent Records
Francesca Battistelli, Fervent Records
Kari Jobe, Sparrow Records
Lecrae, Reach Records
MercyMe, Fair Trade Services

New Artist of the Year
About a Mile, Word Entertainment
Danny Gokey, BMG Rights Management
I Am They, Provident Label Group
Lauren Daigle, Centricity Music
NF, Capitol CMG Label Group

Producer of the Year
Aaron Lindsey
Ed Cash
Seth Mosley
Wayne Haun
David Garcia and Ben Glover (Team)
Joseph Prielozny and Chris Mackey (Team)

Rap/Hip Hop and Urban

Rap/Hip Hop Song of the Year
"Who You Know" – Derek Minor, (writers) Derek Johnson and Chris Mackey
"Sideways (ft. Lecrae)" – KB, (writers) Kevin Burgess, Lecrae Moore, Jamal James, Chris Mackey and Joseph Prielozny
"All I Need Is You" – Lecrae, (writers) Lecrae Moore, Dustin "Dab" Bowie, Latasha Williams, Chris Mackey and Joseph Prielozny
"Mansion" – NF, (writers) Nate Feurstein, Lauren Strahm and David Garcia
"Volcano (ft. Jonathan Thulin)" – Rapture Ruckus, (writers) Bradley Dring, Joshua Hawkins, Jonathan Thulin

Rap/Hip Hop Album of the Year
Empire – Derek Minor, (producers) Dirty Rice, Derek Minor, Black Knight, Jonny Grande, Anthony "AntMan Wonder" Reid, Tyshane, Bandplay, G-Roc, Gawvi, Syksense
Tomorrow We Live – KB, (producers) Swoope, Dirty Rice, Joseph Prielozny, Supe, Kevin Burgess, Mpax, 808xElite, Justin Ebach, De-Capo Music Group for Vakseen LLC
Anomaly – Lecrae, (producers) Dirty Rice, Joseph Prielozny, Street Symphony, S1, J. Rhodes, 808XEliTE, GAWVI, Nate Robinson, Mashell, Derek Minor, Vohnbeatz, Lasanna "Ace" Harris, Alex Medina, Jaquebeatz
Mansion – NF, (producers) Tommee Profitt, David Garcia
Rise – Trip Lee, (producers) GAWVI, Jonatan Barahona, Alex Medina

Rock

Rock Songs of the Year
"Safety (ft. Stephen Christian)" – Fireflight, (writers) Dawn Michele and Rusty Varenkamp
"Darkest Part" – Red, (writers) Anthony Armstrong, Michael Barnes, Randy Armstrong, Rob Graves, Josh Baker, Mark Holman
"Good To Be Alive" – Skillet, (writers) John L. Cooper, Zac Maloy, Tom Douglas
"Furious Love" – VERIDIA, (writers) Brandon Brown, Deena Jakoub, Ian Eskelin, Barry Weeks
"Dead Man" – We as Human, (writer) Justin Cordle

Rock/Contemporary Song of the Year
"Fireblazin" – Capital Kings (writers), Cole Walowac, Jonathan White, Neon Feather, David Garcia and Toby Mckeehan
"Lift Your Head Weary Sinner (Chains)" – Crowder, (writers) Ed Cash, David Crowder, Seth Philpott
"Messengers (ft. for KING & COUNTRY)" – Lecrae, (writers) Lecrae Moore, Joel Smallbone, Luke Smallbone, Ricky Jackson, Ran Jackson, Chris Mackey, Joseph Prielozny and Torrance Esmono
"Brother" – Needtobreathe, (writers) Bear Rinehart and Bo Rinehart
"Let It Out" – Switchfoot, (writers) Jon Foreman, Tim Foreman, Andrew Pearson

Rock Album of the Year
Lowborn – Anberlin, (producer) Anberlin
Attack – Disciple, (producer) Travis Wyrick
Fight the Silence – For Today, (producer) Will Putney
of Beauty and Rage – RED, (producer) Rob Graves
Oxygen: Inhale – Thousand Foot Krutch, (producers) Aaron Sprinkle and Trevor McNevan

Rock/Contemporary Album of the Year
Anchor – Colton Dixon, (producers) David Garcia, Adam Watts, Andy Dodd, Gannin Arnold
The Borderland Sessions – John Mark McMillan, (producer) Elijah Mosely
Live from the Woods – Needtobreathe, (producers) NEEDTOBREATHE
Invader – Rapture Ruckus, (producers) Brad Dring, Geoff Duncan, Steve Aiello
The Edge of the Earth (EP) – Switchfoot, (producers) Neal Avron, the Foreman Brothers

Pop

Pop/Contemporary Song of the Year
"Come As You Are" – Crowder, (writers) David Crowder, Matt Maher, Ben Glover
"Shoulders" – for KING & COUNTRY, (writers), Luke Smallbone, Joel Smallbone, Ben Glover, Tedd Tjornhom
"Touch The Sky" – Hillsong United, (writers) Joel Houston, Dylan Thomas and Michael Guy Chislett
"How Can It Be" – Lauren Daigle, (writer) Paul Mabury, Jason Ingram, Jeff Johnson
"We Believe" – Newsboys, (writers) Travis Ryan, Richie Fike, Matt Hooper
"Soul On Fire" – Third Day, (writers), Mac Powell, Tai Anderson, David Carr, Mark Lee, Brenton Brown, Matt Maher

Pop/Contemporary Album of the Year
Love Ran Red – Chris Tomlin, (producer) Ed Cash
Neon Steeple – Crowder, (producers) David Crowder, Gabe Scott, Solomon Olds, Ed Cash, Christopher Stevens, Christian Paschall, Will Hunt, Jared Fox
Run Wild. Live Free. Love Strong. – for KING & COUNTRY, (producers) Seth Mosley, Tedd T., Matt Hales, Ben Glover
How Can It Be – Lauren Daigle, (producers) Paul Mabury and Jason Ingram
Saints and Sinners – Matt Maher, (producers) Paul Moak, Matt Maher, Ed Cash, Jason Ingram
Lead Us Back: Songs of Worship – Third Day, (producers) The Sound Kids, Third Day

Inspirational

Inspirational Song of the Year
"Ghost Town (Freedom)" – David Phelps, (writer) David Phelps
"This I Believe (The Creed)" – Hillsong Worship, (writers) Matt Crocker, Ben Fielding
"O Love Of God" – Laura Story, (writers) Laura Story, Cindy Morgan, Ian Cron
"More And More Of You" – Selah (writers) Jennie Lee Riddle, Richie Fike, Jonathan Lee
"Christ Be All Around Me" – Michael W. Smith, (writers) Leeland Mooring, Jack Mooring, David Leonard, Leslie Jordan

Inspirational Album of the Year
Be Still and Know – Amy Grant, (producers) Vince Gill, Marshall Altman, Brown Bannister
Glorious Day: Hymns of Faith – Casting Crowns, (producer) Mark A. Miller
Above It All – Phillips, Craig & Dean, (producers) Seth Mosley, Nathan Nockels
You Amaze Us – Selah, (producers) Jason Kyle, Todd Smith, Allan Hall, Jordan Mohilowski, Ed Cash 
A Cappella – The Martins, (producers) Michael English, Lari Goss, The Martins, David Phelps, Matthew Holt

Gospel

Southern Gospel Song of the Year
"Happy People" – Ernie Haase & Signature Sound, (writers) Ernie Haase, Wayne Haun, Joel Lindsey
"Sometimes It Takes a Mountain" – Gaither Vocal Band, (writers) Mark Mathes, Gloria Gaither
"What A Happy Time" – Goodman Revival, (arrangers) Michael Sykes, Johnny Minick
"Pray Now" – Karen Peck & New River, (writers) Karen Peck Gooch, Dave Clark and Michael Farren
"Hidden Heroes" – The Talleys, (writers) Dixie Lynn Phillips and Sharon Phillips

Southern Gospel Album of the Year
Sometimes It Takes a Mountain – Gaither Vocal Band, (producers) Bill Gaither, Ben Isaacs, David Phelps
Songs in the Key of Happy – Goodman Revival, (producers) Michael Sykes, Johnny Minick
Threads of Mercy – Ivan Parker, (producer) Roger Talley
Pray Now – Karen Peck & New River, (producer) Wayne Haun
Living in Harmony – Triumphant, (producer) Wayne Haun

Contemporary Gospel/Urban Song of the Year
"Worth Fighting For" – Brian Courtney Wilson, (writers) Brian Courtney Wilson and Aaron Lindsey
"I Luh God (ft. Big Shizz)" – Erica Campbell (writers) Warryn Campbell, Erica Campbell, LaShawn Daniels
"Flaws" – Kierra Sheard, (writer) Diane Warren
"Say Yes (ft. Beyoncé & Kelly Rowland)" – Michelle Williams, (writers) Harmony Samuels, Michelle Williams, H."Carmen Reece" Culver, Al Sherrod Lambert
"No Greater Love" – Smokie Norful, (writers) Aaron W. Lindsey and Smokie Norful

Contemporary Gospel/Urban Album of the Year
Vintage Worship – Anita Wilson, (producers) Rick Robinson, Anita Wilson
I Will Trust – Fred Hammond, (producers) Fred Hammond, Raymond Hammond, Geo Bivins, Calvin Rodgers, Phillip Feaster, King Logan, Shuan Martin
Graceland – Kierra Sheard, (producer) J. Drew Sheard II
Journey to Freedom – Michelle Williams, (producer) Harmony Samuels
Forever Yours – Smokie Norful, (producers) Aaron Lindsey, Antonio Dixon, Derek "DOA" Allen, BlacElvis, Tre Myles

Traditional Gospel Song of the Year
"Fill Me Up" – Casey J (writer) William Reagan
"#War" – Charles Jenkins & Fellowship Chicago, (writer) Charles Jenkins
"How Awesome Is Our God (ft. Yolanda Adams)" – Israel & New Breed (writers) Israel Houghton, Nevelle Diedericks, Meleasa Houghton
"This Place" – Tamela Mann (writer) Darrell Blair
"God My God" – VaShawn Mitchell (writer) VaShawn Mitchell
"Send The Rain" – William McDowell (writer) William McDowell and William McMillan

Traditional Gospel Album of the Year
Worth Fighting For – Brian Courtney Wilson, (producer) Aaron W. Lindsey
The Truth – Casey J, (producers) Korey Bowie, Chris Carter
Any Given Sunday – Charles Jenkins & Fellowship Chicago, (producer) Charles Jenkins
Amazing – Ricky Dillard and New G, (producers) Ricky Dillard, Will Bogle, Rick Robinson
Unstoppable – VaShawn Mitchell, (producers) VaShawn Mitchell and Daniel Weatherspoon

Country and Bluegrass

Bluegrass Song of the Year
"Stacking Up Rocks" – Balsam Range, (writer) Buddy Melton
"Mighty To Save" – Chigger Hill Boys & Terri (writers) Ben Fielding, Reuben Morgan
"He Made The Tree" – Doyle Lawson and Quicksilver, (writers) Tom Botkin and Donnie Skaggs
"God Is There" – Lizzy Long & Rhonda Vincent, (writers) Wayne Haun and Joel Lindsey
"Daddy Was An Old Time Preacher Man (ft. Rhonda Vincent) – Volume Five, (writers) Dolly Parton and Dorothy Jo Owens

Country Song of the Year
"I Saw The Light" – Alabama (writer) Hank Williams, Sr.
"I'll Be There With You" – Doug Anderson (writers) Shelby Haun, Wayne Haun and Joel Lindsey
"Ain't It Just Like The Lord" – Gordon Mote, (writers) Lee Black, Jason Cox, Kenna Turner West
"I Wanna Be There" – The Isaacs, (writers) Jimmy Yeary, Sonya Isaacs and Rebecca Isaacs Bowman
"Sweet Jesus (ft. Merle Haggard)" – The Oak Ridge Boys (writers) Merle Haggard, Kenny Vernon

Bluegrass/Country Album of the Year
Angels Among Us – Alabama, (producers) Jeff Cook, Teddy Gentry, Randy Owen
Worship Him – John Bowman, (producer) John Bowman
Directions Home (Songs We Love, Songs You Know) – Point of Grace, (producers) Andy Leftwich, Stuart Dill, Rodger Ryan, Point of Grace
Here's to the Ones – Rhett Walker Band, (producers) Paul Moak, Ed Cash, Rhett Walker Band
Rock of Ages, Hymns and Gospel Favorites – The Oak Ridge Boys, (producers) Ben Isaacs, Duane Allen

Praise and Worship

Worship Song of the Year
"Great Are You Lord" – All Sons & Daughters, (writers) David Leonard, Jason Ingram, Leslie Jordan (publishers) Integrity's Alleluia! Music/Integrity's Praise! Music/Open Hands Music/Sony/ATV Timber Publishing
"Holy Spirit" – Francesca Battistelli, (writers) Bryan Torwalt, Katie Torwalt (publishers) Capitol CMG Genesis/Jesus Culture Music
"Forever (We Sing Hallelujah)" – Kari Jobe, (writers) Brian Johnson, Christa Black Gifford, Gabriel Wilson, Jenn Johnson, Joel Taylor, Kari Jobe (publishers) Bethel Music Publishing/KAJE Songs/Worship Together Music
"Because He Lives (Amen)" – Matt Maher, (writers) Chris Tomlin, Daniel Carson, Ed Cash, Gloria Gaither, Jason Ingram, Matt Maher, Bill Gaither (publishers) Alletrop Music/Hanna Street Music/I Am A Pilgrim Songs/Open Hands Music/S. D. G. Publishing/sixsteps Music/Sixsteps Songs/Worship Together Music/worshiptogether.com songsworshiptogether.com
"This Is Amazing Grace" – Phil Wickham, (writers) Jeremy Riddle, Josh Farro, Phil Wickham (publishers) Bethel Music Publishing/Phil Wickham Music/Seems Like Music/Sing My Songs/WB Music Corp.

Worship Album of the Year
All Sons & Daughters – All Sons & Daughters, (producers) Paul Mabury and Shane Wilson
We Will Not Be Shaken – Bethel Music, (producers) Bobby Strand and Chris Greely
Love Ran Red – Chris Tomlin, (producer) Ed Cash
No Other Name – Hillsong Worship, (producer) Michael Guy Chislett
Even So Come – Passion, (producer) Nathan Nockels

Others

Children's Music Album of the Year
Capitol Kids! Hits – Capitol Kids!, (producer) Brian Hitt
Best of Lifeway Kids Worship Volume 1 – Lifeway Kids, (producer) Jeremy Johnson, Paul Marino, Jeffrey B. Scott
Sing The Bible with Slugs & Bugs – Randall Goodgame (producer) Ben Shive
Brave – Saddleback Kids, (producer) David Dalton
25 Favorite Sing-A-Long Hymns for Kids – Songtime Kids, (producer) Larry Hall
Kids – The Hoppers, (producer) Mike Hopper

Spanish Language Album of the Year
Fuego – Esperanza de Vida, (producers) Eduardo Durney and Armando Moreno
Gloria A Dios – Gateway Worship, (producers) Walker Beach, Robert Quintanay, Rosemary Taleton
Esto Es Jesus Culture – Jesus Culture, (producer) Jeremy Edwardson
Me Vistio De Promesas – Julissa, (producers) Mike Rivera, Onis Rodriguez, Wiso Aponte, Chris Rocha
Como En El Cielo – Miel San Marcos, (producers) Josh Morales, Luis Morales, Jr., Samy Morales, Chris Rocha, Roberto Prado

Christmas Album of the Year
Christmas – Guy Penrod, (producer) Michael Omartian
When Christmas Comes – Kim Walker-Smith, (producer) Jeremy Edwardson
The Spirit of Christmas – Michael W. Smith & Friends, (producers) Michael W. Smith, Robert Deaton, David Hamilton
Motown Christmas – Various Artists, (producer) Aaron Lindsey
All Is Calm, All Is Bright – Various Artists, (producers) Andrew Greer and Kyle Buchanan

Choral Collection of the Year
Splendor of Heaven, (creators) Geron Davis, Tyler Brinson
Ready To Sing Gaither Homecoming Favorites, (creator) Russell Mauldin
The Song of Christmas, (creators) Phil Barfoot, Cliff Duren, Ken Barker, Craig AdamsONE, (creators) Bradley Knight
Then Sings My Soul (A Worship Service of Hymns, Scripture and Inspirational Readings For Choir, Congregation and Worship Leader), (creators) Cliff Duren

Recorded Music Packaging
After All These Years – Andrew Peterson, (art director & design) Christopher Tobias (hand lettering) Joseph Alessia (photographer) Keely Scott
Anchor – Colton Dixon, (art director & design) Sarah Sung (photographer) David Molnar
Neon Steeple – Crowder, (art director) Shelley Giglio, Mike McCloskey, Leighton Ching, Becca Wildsmith, (design) Leighton Ching (photographer) Zack Arias, Mary Caroline Mann
Anomaly – Lecrae, (art director) Don Clark, (designer) Invisible Creature, (illustrator) Robert Carter, Kevin Fleming, Shinbone Creative (photographer) Mary Caroline Mann
Rise – Trip Lee, (art directors) Alex Medina, Ryan Clark, (design) Invisible Creature (illustrator) Ryan Clark (photographer) Sam Hurd

Musicals

Musical of the Year
At The Cross (Love Ran Red), (creator) Bradley Knight
The Cross Changes Everything, (creators) Jeff Bumgardner, Joel Lindsey
If The Grave Could Shout, (creator) Jason Cox
Once You've Seen The Star, (creator) Belinda Smith
We're Glad You Came (A Musical Celebration of the Savior's Birth), (creators) Jeff Bumgardner, Joel Lindsey

Youth/Children's Musical of the Year
An Unplugged Christmas, (creators) Susie Williams, Luke Gambill
David's Dynasty, (creators) Gina Boe, Barb Dorn, Sue C. Smith, Christopher Davis
The Go Tour, (creators) Jeff Slaughter, Brian Green
God's Not Dead (A Faith Musical For Kids), (creators) Dale Mathews, Dana Anderson
Back to the Cross (A Kids Musical Adventure Through Time), (creator) Christy Semsen

Videos

Short Form Music Video of the Year
You Can't Stop Me – Andy Mineo, (director & producer) Kyle Dettman
Take This City – Everfound, (director & producer) Sean Hagwell
Shoulders – for KING  & COUNTRY, (director) Ben Smallbone (producer) Ben Stansbury
Dreams – King's Kaleidoscope, (director & producer) David Faddis, Belief Films
Wake Up – NF, (director) Jon Jon Augustavo (producer) Andrew Lerios, PhilyMack Productions

Long Form Video of the Year
We Will Not Be Shaken – Bethel Music, (director) Nathan Grubbs and Luke Manwaring, (producer) Nathan Grubbs
Wake Up the Wonder – Elevation Worship, (director) Steven Lester (producers) Steven Furtick, Cherish Rush, Lindsey Newton, Kelly Draddy & Ashley Hollingsworth, Elevation Church
No Other Name (Live at Hillsong Conference) – Hillsong Worship, (directors) Ben Field and Richard Cause (producer) Ben Field, Hillsong
Faithful – NewSong (director) Nathan Corona (producer) Austin Woodward, Dust Brand Films
This Is Our Time – Planetshakers, (director) Peter John (producer) Planetshakers, Epik Films

Films

Inspirational Film of the Year
 Do You Believe? (director) Jon Gunn (producers) Pure Flix Entertainment, 10 West Studios, Believe Entertainment, Toy Gun Films
Left Behind, (director) Vic Armstrong (producer) Stoney Lake Entertainment
 Moms' Night Out , (directors) The Erwin Brothers (producers) Affirm Films, FourBoys Entertainment, Provident Films, Pure Flix Entertainment, TriStar Pictures
 The Song, (director) Richard Ramsey (producers) City on a Hill Productions, Jorva Entertainment Productions
 When the Game Stands Tall, (director) Thomas Carter (producers) Affirm Films, Mandalay Pictures

References

External links 
 

2015 music awards
GMA Dove Awards
2015 in American music
2015 in Tennessee
GMA